Elmayer dance school is a ballroom dance school in Vienna, Austria founded in 1919 by a former Austro-Hungarian Army officer Willy Elmayer von Vestenbrugg. It is considered one of the most prominent dance schools in the world and its "Elmayer Kränzchen" hosts the record for largest ball opening in the world. Students at Elmayer may also finish their courses with the official "Österreichische Tanzleistungsabzeichen" examination, which at higher levels grants students to hold their own dance classes.  It is currently headed by the founder's grandson, Thomas Schäfer-Elmayer.

References

External links

 

Dance in Austria
Dance schools